Almost Acoustic Christmas is an annual concert run by the Los Angeles radio station KROQ-FM.

The first show was held in December 1989, though then it was simply called the KROQ Xmas Bash. In 1990 the show became bigger and attracted increasingly popular alternative rock bands and singers. It takes place over a weekend in mid-December, and has in recent years been broadcast for free on KROQ-FM's website. The festival started off as a one-day event, and every year, since 1992, it has been held as a two-day festival (although the 1999 and 2022 shows were a one-day festival).

From 1989 through 2012 the show took place at the Universal Amphitheatre in Universal City, except for 1998 where it was held at the Shrine Auditorium in Los Angeles, and in 1999 where it was held at the Arrowhead Pond in Anaheim. After the Universal Amphitheatre closed in September 2013, the show performed again at the Shrine Auditorium in December 2013. In 2014 the event was moved to The Forum. In 2019, the show took place at the Honda Center in Anaheim and returned to the Kia Forum in 2022.

KROQ Almost Acoustic Christmas concerts benefit Para Los Ninos and the Al Wooten Jr Heritage Center, plus other local charities.

In 1999, a compilation of live recordings, The Best of KROQ's Almost Acoustic Christmas, was released.

On December 18, 2009, KROQ-FM released a compilation called KROQ Almost Acoustic Christmas 2009, a benefit album with proceeds benefiting Para Los Ninos and the Al Wooten Heritage Center.

Due to the COVID-19 pandemic, KROQ Almost Acoustic Christmas did not take place in 2020 and 2021. 

KROQ Almost Acoustic Christmas returned to the Kia Forum on December 10, 2022.

Line-ups

Bands listed in alphabetical order (or, if known, in reverse order of night's performance).

References

External links
Official website

Music festivals in Los Angeles
Music festivals established in 1989
Almost